Samuel Davis House or Sam Davis House may refer to:

Samuel Davis House (Norwich Township, Franklin County, Ohio), listed on the NRHP in Franklin County, Ohio, in the Columbus, Ohio area
Samuel Henry Davis House, Dublin, Ohio, listed on the NRHP in Franklin County, Ohio
Sam Davis House (Smyrna, Tennessee), listed on the NRHP in Rutherford County, Tennessee

See also
Davis House (disambiguation)